The Teton County Courthouse, located at 1 Main Ave. S. in Choteau, is the county courthouse serving Teton County, Montana. Built in 1906, thirteen years after Teton County was formed, the building was the county's first permanent courthouse. Architects Joseph B. Gibson and George H. Shanley designed the courthouse in the Renaissance Revival style. The -story building was built using locally quarried ashlar sandstone. The building's design features an arched entrance topped by a square tower, dentillated eaves, and a hip roof with three dormers.

The courthouse was listed on the National Register of Historic Places on November 29, 2006.

References

External links 

Courthouses on the National Register of Historic Places in Montana
Renaissance Revival architecture in Montana
Government buildings completed in 1906
County courthouses in Montana
National Register of Historic Places in Teton County, Montana
1906 establishments in Montana